Mimics Action 500 is a 1995 Indian Malayalam comedy film, directed by Balu Kiriyath and produced by Harikumaran Thampi. The film stars Rajan P. Dev, KPAC Lalitha, A. C. Zainuddin and Abi in the lead roles. The film's musical score was done by S. P. Venkatesh.

Cast

Rajan P. Dev as Manimala Mamachan
KPAC Lalitha as Sharada Teacher
A. C. Zainuddin as Johnykutty
Abi as Devassykutty
Kottayam Nazeer as Krishnankutty
Kalabhavan Narayanankutty as Narayanankutty
Nandu Pothuval as Sankarankutty
Kalabhavan Navas as Babykutty
Harisree George as Ramankutty
Kalabhavan Santhosh as Pappankutty
Sagar Shiyas as Jimmykutty
Shaju K. S. as Kesavankutty
Kalabhavan Haneef as Georgekutty
Chippy as Sreedevi, Souparnika Thampuratti (dual role)
Mala Aravindan as Kurup
Narendra Prasad as Kulashekara Varma Valiyakoyi Thampuran
Prathapachandran as A. V. Thampan
Mahesh as Rajan Thampan,adopted son of A.V. Thampan and manager of Club 2000 
Baburaj
Geetha Vijayan as Alice
Manju Satheesh
Sonia Baiju Kottarakkara
Bindu Varappuzha as Sabeena
Priyanka Anoop as Lalitha
Kalabhavan Rahman
Tini Tom as club 2000 performer
Mafia Sasi as Gunda
Ronald Poyya as Driver and Imitating Mohanlal

Soundtrack
The music was composed by S. P. Venkatesh and the lyrics were written by Gireesh Puthenchery.

References

External links
 

1995 films
1990s Malayalam-language films